Marco Mazzoni (born 17 January 1982) is a Milan-based Italian artist, originally from Tortona. He is generally considered a portrait artist and only uses coloured pencils in his work. Mazzoni's work holds a strong interest in flora and fauna(flora e fauna), and often depicts the female herbalists of 16th—18th Century Sardinia. Notably, Marco created a portrait of musician Anomie Belle included in the album art for Flux, and as the cover of The Good Life EP.

Mazzoni received a bachelor's degree in painting from Brera Art Academy in Milan. His work has been exhibited in galleries throughout Europe and the United States.

Publications 

 Journeaux Troublés, Soleil Productions, 2020
 Poucette, Albin Michel, 2018

Notes and references

External links 
Official Website
Official Facebook

Italian artists
Brera Academy alumni
1982 births
Living people